The Santa Paula Hardware Company Building, located in Santa Paula, California, and more commonly referred to as the Union Oil Company Building, is significant for its historical importance as the birthplace of the Union Oil Company on October 17, 1890. Originally, the Santa Paula Hardware and Post Office were downstairs, and the Union Oil Company offices were upstairs. The building continued to serve as a field division office after the main headquarters moved to Los Angeles in 1900.

The Ventura County Cultural Heritage Board designated the building County Landmark #36 in December 1977. The building is a California Historical Landmark (#996) and is listed on the National Register of Historic Places (NPS-86002619).

California Oil Museum
In 1950, the Union Oil Museum was established, and in 1990, for its Centennial Celebration, the building was restored to its original appearance and reopened as the California Oil Museum. The exhibits include oil and gas industry equipment, such as an 1890s iron and timber operating drilling rig, historic gas pumps and product containers, a recreated 1890s period Union Oil Company corporate headquarters office, and a 1930s period apartment. The building is leased to the city of Santa Paula by Chevron.

See also 
 List of Registered Historic Places in Ventura County, California
 Ventura County Historic Landmarks & Points of Interest
 List of petroleum museums

References

External links
 Official California Oil Museum website

Petroleum museums
Museums in Ventura County, California
Industry museums in California
Santa Paula, California
Buildings and structures in Santa Paula, California
Commercial buildings on the National Register of Historic Places in California
National Register of Historic Places in Ventura County, California
California Historical Landmarks
Queen Anne architecture in California